Jeberos is a town in the Loreto Region of Peru.

Jeberos is served by the Bellavista Airport.

References

Populated places in the Loreto Region